Nigel Crawford (born 10 October 1979, in Meath) is an Irish Gaelic footballer who plays for St Peter's, Dunboyne and the Meath county team. Crawford made his debut for Meath in late 1998 and has been there since. He has won three Leinster medals in 1999, 2001 and in 2010 and has won one All-Ireland medal. Crawford was named as Meath captain for the 2010 Championship, captaining them to their win over Louth in the Leinster Final.

Honours
All-Ireland Senior Football Championship: 1
1999
Leinster Senior Football Championship: 3
1999, 2001, 2010
Meath Senior Football Championship: 2
1998, 2005

References
Crawford Nigel. hoganstand.com.

1979 births
Living people
Meath inter-county Gaelic footballers
St Peter's Dunboyne Gaelic footballers
Winners of one All-Ireland medal (Gaelic football)